Elia is a genus of gastropods belonging to the family Clausiliidae.

The species of this genus are found in Eastern Mediterranean and near Black Sea.

Species:

Elia corpulenta 
Elia derasa 
Elia huebneri 
Elia laevestriata 
Elia moesta 
Elia multiserrata 
Elia novorossica 
Elia ossetica 
Elia retowskii 
Elia somchetica 
Elia tuschetica

References

Clausiliidae